Knut Ruben Börje Hansson (9 May 1911 – 10 February 1990) was a Swedish football forward who played for Sweden in the 1938 FIFA World Cup. He also played for Landskrona BoIS.

References

External links

1911 births
1990 deaths
Swedish footballers
Sweden international footballers
Association football forwards
Landskrona BoIS players
1938 FIFA World Cup players